Edema, (also spelled oedema, and named from the analogous disorder in humans and other animals), is a disorder in plants caused by the build-up of water in plant tissues faster than the leaves can transpire. The excess fluid bursts the cell membranes, causing the appearance of growths, particularly on the underside of leaves.

Symptoms 
Edema causes the appearance of growths, mainly on the underside of leaves, and can also cause indentations on the top side of leaves. The growths can take a different appearance depending on the plant species, but can often take the form of needle like hairs, blisters, corky growths and white crusty eruptions. Susceptibility to edema varies by plant species but almost any broad-leaved plant can be affected. In severely affected plants the growths can also appear on the stems and cause leaves to turn yellow and drop off, leaves can also become distorted. If the conditions causing edema are prolonged then the plant can become spindly and have stunted growth.

Edema can often be confused with a variety of other plant conditions, such as powdery mildew or other mould, pests, viruses or nutrient crystals.

Causes 
 Overwatering
 Excessive humidity
 Warm soil and cool air conditions, particularly when in combination with high humidity and overly moist soil
 Poor air circulation
 Overzealous removal of foliage or shoots
 Occasionally, a reaction to chemicals
 Improper nutrient levels, particularly low potassium and calcium

Treatment 
A number of changes to the growing environment can all contribute to the improvement of edema symptoms. These include:
 Improvement of air circulation
 Reduction of air temperature
 Reduction of humidity
 Taking care to not wet the leaves when watering
 Reduce watering if soil is water-logged, while also taking care not to under-water
 Using a well drained growing medium
 Addition of nutrients including potassium nitrate and calcium
 Increasing light intensity
 Spacing out plants to reduce overcrowding

Prognosis 

Minor cases are unlikely to significantly harm the plant. If adequately treated by improving conditions, new growth will not be affected, however the growths that occurred on leaves during the episode of edema will remain present indefinitely.

Severe cases can cause stunted growth, a spindly appearance, and yellow leaves which can eventually fall off of the plant.

The disorder is not infectious and if edema is the only problem, then the plants are safe to handle and the parts of the plant which would usually be edible will remain safe to eat. However, care should be taken to ensure that other problems, such as mould or pests have not been mistaken for edema.

References 

Plant diseases